Melittidae is a small bee family, with over 200 described species  in three subfamilies. The family has a limited distribution, with all described species restricted to Africa and the northern temperate zone.

Fossil melittids have been found occasionally in Eocene amber deposits, including those of Oise, France and the Baltic amber.

Evolution
Early molecular work suggested that the family Melittidae was sister to all other bees, and also that it was paraphyletic. Because of this finding, it was suggested that the three subfamilies of Melittidae should be elevated to family status. Neither study included many melittids, due to their rarity. Later studies suggested that the family could still be monophyletic and a 2013 investigation including a greater number of melittid bees further supports this.

Recent research has shown that Melittids have a lower extinction rate compared to other hymenopterans, yet this family is considered species-poor. This is attributed to a significantly lower diversification rate as seen in other bee families. Danforth et al. suggests that this is because they are oligoleges. Whereas other bees express polylecty (diverse host-plant preferences) allowing them to increase their diversification rate compared to melittids.

Evidence of oil-collection behaviour has been present in melittids since the early Eocene. Amber from Oise, France provided the oldest record of Melittidae and the fourth oldest fossilized bee specimen.

Characteristics
Melittids are typically small to moderate-sized bees, which are well known for their specialist and oligolectic foraging habits.

Melittids are strictly solitary and they nest in burrows that they dig in soil or sand. All females can reproduce and tend to emerge from the ground some days before the male. They generally mate on host-plants surrounding the area they have emerged. After mating, the gravid female creates a burrow where they bring pollen. On top of the pollen, one egg is laid. This is consumed by the larva over 10 days, after which the larva overwinters and pupates in the next year.

Many melittids (such as Macropis) possess specialized morphology that allow them to collect floral oil.

Classification
The following genera are classified under Melittidae:
Afrodasypoda
Capicola
Ceratomonia
Dasypoda
Eremaphanta
Haplomelitta
Hesperapis
Macropis
Magnomia
Melitta
Pseudophilanthus
Promelitta
Rediviva
Redivivoides
Samba
Uronomia

Citations

Sources

External links
 Online guides to eastern North American Melittidae

 
Bee families
Hymenoptera of Africa
Eocene insects
Cenozoic insects
Extant Eocene first appearances